Diadiaphorus is an extinct genus of litoptern mammal from the Miocene of Argentina (Ituzaingó, Pinturas, Chiquimil and Santa Cruz Formations) and Bolivia (Nazareno Formation), South America.

Description 
 
It had three toes, only one of which touched the ground. This toe had a large hoof; the two outer toes were rudimentary, much like those of early horses such as Merychippus. Unlike horses, however, Diadiaphorus lacked fused limb bones. Its skull was short and had a relatively large brain cavity. Judging from its low molars, Diadiaphorus ate soft vegetation, such as leaves.

References 

Proterotheriids
Miocene mammals of South America
Huayquerian
Chasicoan
Mayoan
Laventan
Colloncuran
Friasian
Santacrucian
Neogene Argentina
Fossils of Argentina
Ituzaingó Formation
Neogene Bolivia
Fossils of Bolivia
Fossil taxa described in 1887
Taxa named by Florentino Ameghino
Prehistoric placental genera
Austral or Magallanes Basin
Santa Cruz Formation